Beat von Allmen (born 26 October 1941) is a Swiss alpine skier. He competed in the men's giant slalom at the 1964 Winter Olympics.

References

1941 births
Living people
Swiss male alpine skiers
Olympic alpine skiers of Switzerland
Alpine skiers at the 1964 Winter Olympics
Sportspeople from Bern
20th-century Swiss people